Manappattu is a village in Bahour Commune of Bahour taluk  in the Union Territory of Puducherry, India. It lies east of NH-45A at a distance of 2 km from it.

Geography
Manappattu is bordered by  Bahour in the west, Pillaiyarkuppam in the north, Bay of Bengal in east and Krishnavaram, Pudukuppam in the south.

Villages
Following are the list of villages under Manappattu Village Panchayat.

 Manappattu
 Kanniakoil
 Kattukuppam
 Varakalodaipet

Road Network
Manappattu is connected by Kanniakoil - Manappattu road. Also Pannithittu - Pudukuppam road connects Manappattu.

Gallery

Politics
Manappattu is a part of Bahour (Union Territory Assembly constituency) which comes under Puducherry (Lok Sabha constituency)

References

External links
 Official website of the Government of the Union Territory of Puducherry

Villages in Puducherry district